The K745 Blue Shark (Hangul: 청상어 경어뢰) is a light anti-submarine torpedo developed for the Republic of Korea Navy in 2004. The Blue Shark torpedo can be deployed from surface ships, ASW helicopters and maritime patrol aircraft. Production cost for each torpedo is at about ₩ 1,000,000,000.

Blue Shark torpedoes are fitted to the Incheon class frigate (FFX).

Variants
An improved variant, the lightweight torpedo-2 is being developed by LIG Nex1. New capabilities include longer range and lesser vulnerability to decoys.

Operators

 : Philippine Navy
 : Republic of Korea Navy

See also 
 APR-3E torpedo - Russian equivalent
 Mark 54 Lightweight Torpedo - US Navy's equivalent
 A244-S - Italian equivalent
 MU90 Impact - French/Italian equivalent
 Sting Ray (torpedo) - British equivalent
 TAL Shyena - Indian equivalent
 Yu-7 torpedo - Chinese equivalent
 Type 97 light weight torpedo (G-RX4) - Japanese equivalent

References

Torpedoes of South Korea
Aerial torpedoes
Military equipment introduced in the 2000s